John Palaiologos (1286–1307) was a son of the Byzantine Emperor Andronikos II Palaiologos (reigned 1282–1328) and his second wife, Irene of Montferrat.

He received the supreme courtly dignity of Despot on 22 May 1295, and married Irene Palaiologina Choumnaina, the daughter of Nikephoros Choumnos, in 1303. The pair did not have any children. From 1304, he served as governor of Thessalonica, where he made donations of property to the Hodegetria Monastery. In 1305, the throne of the March of Montferrat became vacant and his mother wanted to send John to take it up, but was successfully opposed by the Patriarch of Constantinople, Athanasius I, so that John's younger brother Theodore was sent instead. John Palaiologos died in 1307 in Thessalonica. In 1321, his body was transferred to Constantinople and buried in the Pantokrator Monastery.

Sources
 

1286 births
1307 deaths
14th-century Byzantine people
13th-century Byzantine people
Byzantine governors of Thessalonica
Despots (court title)
John
Sons of Byzantine emperors